The Fighting Sheriff is a 1931 American Western film directed by Louis King and starring Buck Jones, Loretta Sayers and Robert Ellis.

Cast
 Buck Jones as Sheriff Bob Terry 
 Loretta Sayers as Mary Cameron 
 Robert Ellis as Flash Halloway 
 Harlan Knight as Deputy Calico Cox 
 Paul Fix as Jack Cameron 
 Tom Bay as Sam - Henchman 
 Lillian Worth as Florabell 
 Nina Quartero as Tiana 
 Clarence Muse as Curfew 
 Lillian Leighton as Aunt Sally

References

Bibliography
 Pitts, Michael R. Western Movies: A Guide to 5,105 Feature Films. McFarland, 2012.

External links
 

1931 films
1931 Western (genre) films
American Western (genre) films
Films directed by Louis King
Columbia Pictures films
American black-and-white films
1930s English-language films
1930s American films